Cuthbert Ellison (12 July 1783 – 13 June 1860) was a British Whig politician.

He was born the son of Henry Ellison in Hebburn, County Durham and inherited his father's estate in 1795, aged 12. He was educated at Harrow School and Christ's College, Cambridge. He became a Gateshead borough holder in 1809, governor of the Gateshead Dispensary in 1839, and president in 1841. He was appointed High Sheriff of Durham
in 1828.

He was elected as a Member of Parliament (MP) for Newcastle upon Tyne at the 1812 general election and held the seat until he stood down at the 1830 general election. His generous contributions helped fund Gateshead buildings such as Trinity Chapel and St Mary's Church amongst other charitable donations. He lived in Gateshead Park (Park House) until 1825 when he moved to Hebburn Hall. He died in London in 1860.

Family 
He married Isabella Grace Ibbetson.
His daughter Sarah Caroline, married Walter James, 1st Baron Northbourne. Another daughter, Isabella Caroline, married George Venables-Vernon, 5th Baron Vernon.

Ellison's brother Robert was an officer in the British Army who fought at the 1815 Battle of Waterloo and represented him at the Newcastle upon Tyne Parliamentary election of 1820.

References

External links 
 
 "SHIPPING INTEREST OF THE COUNTRY.", speech made in the Commons on 7 May 1827
 Gateshead Council
 "A Short History of Gateshead". © Gateshead Metropolitan Borough Council, 1998

1783 births
1860 deaths
People from Hebburn
People from Gateshead
Politicians from Tyne and Wear
People educated at Harrow School
Alumni of Christ's College, Cambridge
Members of the Parliament of the United Kingdom for English constituencies
UK MPs 1812–1818
UK MPs 1818–1820
UK MPs 1820–1826
UK MPs 1826–1830
Whig (British political party) MPs for English constituencies
High Sheriffs of Durham